Denbigh Golf Club (Welsh: Clwb Golff Dinbych) is a golf club based just outside Denbigh at Denbighshire, Wales. It is an 18-hole parkland course with mature trees. Their "Pay and Play" course is available to non-members.

In 2009 a father and son each had a hole-in-one at the club and the odds were said to be 13,000-1. The first lady member to be appointed club president was in 2013, after 105 years of male presidents.

References

Denbigh
Golf clubs and courses in Wales
Golf club